Füger is a surname. Notable people with the surname include:

Friedrich Füger (1751–1818), German classicism portrait and historical painter
Kaspar Füger (also Caspar, c. 1521, after 1592) German Lutheran pastor and hymn writer
Frederick Füger (1836–1913), enlisted man and officer in the U.S. Army, Awarded Medal of Honor at Battle of Gettysburg
Stanley T Fuger, Jr. (1950-), Superior Court Judge, State of Connecticut

See also: Fugger (disambiguation)